The 2003 Victorian Football League season was the 122nd season of the Australian rules football competition.

The premiership was won by the Williamstown Football Club, after defeating Box Hill by 29 points in the Grand Final on 21 September.

League membership and affiliations
There were several changes to the VFL–AFL reserves affiliations prior to the 2003 season:
, which had been partially affiliated with Port Melbourne, withdrew from having any connection with the VFL, instead electing to field a stand-alone reserves team in the AFL Canberra competition. Sydney broke off the affiliation with one year left on the contract, prompting a lawsuit from Port Melbourne.
, after spending the previous three years using the Murray Kangaroos as its VFL-affiliate, became affiliated with Port Melbourne. The Murray Kangaroos club, which had been a joint venture operation between North Melbourne and the Ovens & Murray Football League, dropped out of the VFL and folded.
, which had been fielding its reserves team in the VFL, became affiliated with the Northern Bullants. The Carlton reserves withdrew from the VFL.
, which had been fielding its reserves team in the VFL, became affiliated with Bendigo. Under the affiliation, Bendigo adopted Essendon's black and red guernsey, and changed its nickname from Diggers to Bombers. The Essendon reserves withdrew from the VFL.

As a result of the changes, the VFL was reduced from sixteen teams to thirteen.  was now the only one of the ten Victorian AFL clubs left fielding its own reserves team in the VFL, with nine clubs in VFL-AFL affiliations.

Premiership season

Ladder

Finals Series

Grand Final

Awards
The Jim 'Frosty' Miller Medal was won for a record fifth consecutive year by Nick Sautner (Northern Bullants), who kicked 82 goals.
The J. J. Liston Trophy was won by David Robbins (Sandringham), who polled 16 votes. It was Robbins' second Liston Trophy, having previously won the award in 2000. Robbins finished ahead of Stephen Jurica (North Ballarat), who finished second with 15 votes, and Jordan Doering (Tasmania) and Adrian Fletcher (Williamstown), who were equal third with 14 votes. Jeremy Clayton (Port Melbourne) polled the most votes with 20, but was ineligible to win the award due to suspension.
The Fothergill-Round Medal was won by Aaron Davey (Port Melbourne).
Williamstown won the reserves premiership. Williamstown 20.15 (135) defeated the Northern Bullants 12.11 (83) in the Grand Final, held as a curtain-raiser to the Seniors Grand Final on 21 September.

Notable events
The VFL granted a favourable fixture to the three stand-alone VFL clubs, Tasmania, North Ballarat and Frankston to try to assist them financially. The clubs were given extra home games (Tasmania had twelve home games for the year, and North Ballarat and Frankston had ten) and they were given extra Sunday matches to avoid clashes with the local competitions which were still mainly played on Saturdays.

See also 
 List of VFA/VFL premiers
 Australian Rules Football
 Victorian Football League
 Australian Football League
 2003 AFL season

References

Victorian Football League seasons
VFL